Andrew Hemming is an English male curler and curling coach.

At the national level, he is a two-time English men's champion curler (1994, 1995).

Teams

Record as a coach of national teams

References

External links

Living people
English male curlers
English curling champions
Scottish male curlers
Scottish curling coaches
Year of birth missing (living people)
Place of birth missing (living people)